Anastasia Eduardovna Chaun (born 11 September 1988) is a Russian swimmer. In 2010, she won the 200 metres breaststroke at the 2010 European Aquatics Championships and the 2010 European Short Course Swimming Championships.

References 

1988 births
Living people
Russian female breaststroke swimmers
Olympic swimmers of Russia
Swimmers at the 2012 Summer Olympics
European Aquatics Championships medalists in swimming

Swimmers from Moscow